Gbubemi Fregene, better known as Chef Fregz, is a Nigerian chef.

Early life and education
Gbubemi Fregene was born in Abeokuta. He grew up in Benin City. He studied Industrial relations and human resource management at Covenant University and cuisine at Le Cordon Bleu Culinary Institute, France.

Career
Gbubemi started his culinary internships at Oakwood Park and Protea Hotel in 2004 and continued at Oleander Lodge in 2007, while studying. In 2009, he started his own catering service called DVARD Catering Service. Fregene left Nigeria in early 2010 to study at Le Cordon Bleu Culinary Institute in  Paris, France, earning a Diploma in Cuisine. At the institute, he learned classical French cooking techniques while also experiencing diverse cultural influences from different countries. After completing his studies at Le Cordon Bleu, he worked as an intern at the Market Restaurant, Paris from November 2010 till February 2011. Fregene was retained in the restaurant after the internship period.

Gbubemi returned to Nigeria and built his brand focusing on attracting Nigerian youths by appealing to their passion for new and creative cooking. In order to meet the need for young chefs to communicate and connect with the upwardly mobile crowd which he serviced, he promoted his brand by hosting regularly summer style cookouts called Chef Fregz™ Special. 
Gbubemi has also been a judge in cooking competitions in Nigeria, including Knorr Taste Quest.

Personal life 
He married Kemi Lala Akindoju in September 2018 and had a son in February 2021.

References

Living people
20th-century births
Nigerian chefs
Businesspeople from Abeokuta
21st-century Nigerian businesspeople
Covenant University alumni
Alumni of Le Cordon Bleu
Nigerian television chefs
Year of birth missing (living people)
Male chefs